Plumas National Forest is a 1,146,000-acre (4,638 km2) United States National Forest located at the northern terminus of the Sierra Nevada, in northern California. The Forest was named after its primary watershed, the Rio de las Plumas, or Feather River.

Geography
About 85% of Plumas National Forest lies in Plumas County, portions extend into eastern Butte, northern Sierra, southern Lassen, and northeastern Yuba counties.

Management
The land is managed by the United States Forest Service under the Department of Agriculture with local management stationed at the Plumas National Forest Supervisor's office in Quincy, California. The forest is also subdivided into three Ranger Districts, the Beckwourth Ranger District, the Feather Falls Ranger District and the Mt. Hough Ranger District, with local management in Blairsden, Oroville, and Quincy, respectively.

History
Plumas was established as the Plumas Forest Reserve by the General Land Office on March 27, 1905. In 1906 the forest was transferred to the U.S. Forest Service, and on March 4, 1907, it became a National Forest. On July 1, 1908, a portion of Diamond Mountain National Forest was added. The Bucks Lake Wilderness was officially designated in 1984 as a part of the National Wilderness Preservation System.

Ecology 

A 2002 study by the Forest Service identified  of the forest as old growth, using an economic type definition.  The most common old-growth forest types are mixed conifer forests of:
 Coast Douglas-fir (Pseudotsuga menziesii var. menziesii)
 Pacific and Columbia Ponderosa Pine (Pinus ponderosa ssp. critchfieldiana) in the west, transitioning to (P. ponderosa ssp. ponderosa) in the far eastern section
 Sierra White Fir (Abies concolor ssp. lowiana)
Jeffrey Pine (Pinus jeffreyi) 
Red Fir (Abies magnifica) 
Sierra Lodgepole Pine (Pinus Contorta ssp. murrayana)
Incense Cedar (Calocedrus decurrens)
Sugar pine (Pinus lambertiana)

Virtually no virgin timberland exists, as the area has been a logging epicenter starting with the gold rush continuing into the modern era.

See also

 List of plants of the Sierra Nevada (U.S.)
 :Category:Fauna of the Sierra Nevada (United States)
Beckwourth Ranger District
Butterfly Valley Botanical Area
Feather Falls
Lake Davis
Frenchman Lake (California)
Bucks Lake
 Moonlight Fire
 Camp Fire (2018)
 Walker Fire
 North Complex Fire
 Dixie Fire
 Disappearance of Gary Mathias, the only one of a group of five men who otherwise perished in a mysterious incident in winter 1978 whose body has not been found

References

External links 

 Official Plumas National Forest website
 Plumas National Forest - Map (detailed)

 
Protected areas of the Sierra Nevada (United States)
Protected areas of Plumas County, California
Protected areas of Butte County, California
Protected areas of Sierra County, California
Protected areas of Lassen County, California
Protected areas of Yuba County, California
Feather River
National Forests of California
Protected areas established in 1905
1905 establishments in California